Vestinian is an extinct Italic language documented only in two surviving inscriptions of the Roman Republic. It is presumed to have been anciently spoken by the tribe of the Vestini, who occupied the region within current Abruzzo from Gran Sasso to the Adriatic Sea in east-central Italy during that time. Vestini is the Roman exonym for the people. Not enough of their presumed language survives to classify it beyond Italic. Vestinian is one of a number of scantily attested Italic languages spoken in small regions of the Apennines directly east of Rome called generally "the minor dialects." There is currently no agreement on their precise classification.

Corpus
Only two inscriptions survive.

Sample text
CIL 12.394 from near Navelli in the Abruzzo, dated mid-third-century BC, is:

Vestinian text:
t.vetio | duno | didet | herclo | iovio | grat | data

Translation into Latin:
T. Vetius donum dedit Herculi Jovio. Grate data.

Translation into Italian:
Tito Vetius ha dato un dono a Ercole Giovo. Dato con gratitudine.

Translation into Spanish:
Tito Vetius le dio un don (regalo) a Hércules Jovio. Dado con gratitud.

Translation into English:
Titus Vetius gave (this as) a gift to Hercules Jovius. Gratefully given.

References

Bibliography
 

Osco-Umbrian languages
Languages attested from the 3rd century BC
Languages extinct in the 1st century BC